Wachovia Building Company Contemporary Ranch House, also known as the Arthur McKimmon II House, is a historic home located in the Cameron Village neighborhood of Raleigh, North Carolina. It is located east of the Cameron Village Historic District.  The house was built in 1951, and is a single-story, double-pile, Ranch-style house.  It has a low pitched hipped roof and a gable-roofed breezeway joining the house to a side-gabled, single-car garage.

It was listed on the National Register of Historic Places in 2014.

References 

Houses on the National Register of Historic Places in North Carolina
Modernist architecture in North Carolina
Houses completed in 1951
Houses in Raleigh, North Carolina
National Register of Historic Places in Raleigh, North Carolina